What is Soul is the seventh album and sixth studio album by Ben E. King, and his fifth and last studio album on the Atco label.

Track listing

"The Record (Baby I Love You)" (Kenny Young, Arthur Resnick)
"She's Gone Again" (Ben E. King)
"There's No Place To Hide" (Roger Atkins, Helen Miller)
"Cry No More" (Bert Berns, Jerry Ragovoy)
"Goodnight My Love, Pleasant Dreams" (George Motola, John Marascalco)
"Katherine" (Ben E. King, Bob Gallo)
"I Can't Break The News To Myself" (Jimmy Williams, Larry Harrison)
"I Swear By Stars Above" (J.R. Bailey, Johnny Northern)
"Get in a Hurry" (Joe Simon)
"They Don't Give Medals To Yesterday's Heroes" (Burt Bacharach, Hal David)
"Teeny Wheeny Little Bit" (Ben E. King)
"What Is Soul?" (Ben E. King, Bob Gallo)

Personnel
Ben E. King – vocals
Art Farmer – trumpet
Dave Burns – trumpet
George Jeffers – trombone
Bill Bivens - tenor sax
Haywood Henry - baritone sax
Robert Banks - piano
Billy Butler - guitar
Chuck Rainey – electric bass
Bernard Purdie – drums
Strings
Bob Gallo and Eric Gale (arr., dir.)

References 

Ben E. King albums
Atco Records albums
Albums produced by Bert Berns
1967 albums